The Sahmyook Foods is a Seventh-day Adventist Church food company in South Korea that produces a large range of soy milks as well as a range of vegetarian products. Sahmyook Foods owns three factories, the oldest being in Choongnam; the second being in Wanju-gun, Jeonbuk and the third being in Bonghwa-gun, Kyungbuk. Sahmyook Foods has received five management awards since 2004. 60% of Sahmyook Foods market is in the United States, while 40% of its market is in Korea.

History
Sahmyook Foods was founded around 1978.

In 2011 the Fair Trade Commission fined Sahmyook Foods 1.5 billion won for price fixing. Sahmyook Foods, Dr. Chung's Food and Maeil Dairies control 82 percent of the soy milk market in South Korea.

Products 
Sahmyook Foods produces meat substitutes, ramen noodles, seaweed & soy milk products.
 Baby Soydrink (Infant & Toddler)
 Black Bean Walnut & Almond
 Black Sesame Soydrink
 Black bean Soydrink
 Black bean Calcium Soydrink
 Calcium Soydrink
 Flavored Soydrinks (Banana, Chocolate & Strawberry)
 Hoeny Soydrink
 Noodle (Hot Taste)
 Noodle (Vegetable)
 Original Crispy Seasnack
 Plain Soydrink
 Regular Soydrink
 Roasted Seaweed Flakes
 Roasted Seaweed Original Flavor
 Roasted Seaweed Snack Olive
 Roasted Seaweed Snack Sesame
 Roasted Seaweed Sushi Sheets
 Seaweed Flakes
 Soybean Vegetable Potato Noodle
 Soy Drink Bottle
 Spicy Vegetable Potato Noodle
 Sweet Tasty Soy Bottle
 Vegeburger
 Vegement

See also 

 La Loma Foods – a food manufacturer formerly owned by the Seventh-day Adventist Church
 List of vegetarian and vegan companies
 Sahmyook University
 Sahmyook Medical Center
 Sahmyook Language School

References

External links 
http://www.sahmyook.co.kr
http://sahmyookusa.com

Seventh-day Adventist food and drink companies
Vegetarian companies and establishments
Food and drink companies of South Korea

ko:삼육식품